Villages located in Loharu Tehsil, Haryana State, India.

List

A
Ahmedwas
Akberpur
Allaudinpur
Amirwas
Azempur

B
Barahlu
Bardu Chaina
Bardu Dhirja
Bardu Jogi
Bardu Mughal
Bardu Puran
Barwas
Basirwas
Bahal
Beran
Bidhnoi
Bisalwas
Bithan
Budhera
Budheri

C
Cheher Kalan
Cheher Khurd

D
Damkora
Dhana Jogi
Dhani Ahmed
Dhani Dholan
Dhani Lachman
Dhani Mansukh
Dhani Shama
Dhani Pitram
Dhigawa Jattan
Dhigawa Shamyan

F
Fartia Bhima
Fartia Kaher
Fartia Tal

G
Gagarwas
Garanpura
Gignaw
Gokalpura
Gopalwas
Gothra

H
Hariawas
Hasanpur

J
Jhanjara Sheoran
Jhanjra Toda
Jhumpa Kalan
Jhumpa Khurd

K
Kasni Kalan
Kasni Khurd
Kharkari
Kharkhari 52 wali
Kurdal
Kushal Pura

L
Ladawas
Loharu

M
Mandhol Kalan
Mohamad Nagar

N
Nakipur
Nangal
Nunsar

O
Obra

P
Pahari
Paju
Patwan
Phartia Bhiman
Phartia Kehar
Phartia Tal

R
Rahimpur

S
Salempur
Sirsi
Sehar
Serla
Sheharyarpur
Shehzmanpur
Shezadpur
Sidhanwa
Singhani
Sohansara
Sorda Jadid
Sorda Kadim
Sudhiwas
Surpura Kalan

Loharu
Loharu
Loharu
Lists of villages in Haryana